Xylobolus subpileatus is a widely distributed species of crust fungus in the family Stereaceae. It was first described scientifically in 1849 by Miles Joseph Berkeley and Moses Ashley Curtis, who considered the fungus a species of Stereum closely related to but distinct from Stereum rugosum. The original collections were made from specimens growing on dead trunks in the United States of Ohio and South Carolina. Xylobolus subpileatus was given its current name by French mycologist Jacques Boidin when he transferred it to the genus Xylobolus in 1958.

References

External links

Fungi described in 1849
Fungi of Asia
Fungi of Europe
Fungi of North America
Taxa named by Miles Joseph Berkeley
Stereaceae